The Edmonton Rush are a lacrosse team based in Edmonton, Alberta playing in the National Lacrosse League (NLL). The 2007 season was the 2nd in franchise history.

The Rush improved on their single-victory inaugural season with a respectable 6-10 record, but still finished well out of the playoffs.

Regular season

Conference standings

Game log
Reference:

Player stats
Reference:

Runners (Top 10)

Note: GP = Games played; G = Goals; A = Assists; Pts = Points; LB = Loose Balls; PIM = Penalty minutes

Goaltenders
Note: GP = Games played; MIN = Minutes; W = Wins; L = Losses; GA = Goals against; Sv% = Save percentage; GAA = Goals against average

Awards

Transactions

Trades

*Later traded to the New York Titans
**Later traded to the Philadelphia Wings
***Later traded back to the Portland LumberJax

Entry Draft
The 2006 NLL Entry Draft took place on September 13, 2006. The Rush made the following selections:

Roster
Reference:

See also
2007 NLL season

References

Edmonton